Doge-1 is a mission planned by Geometric Energy Corporation, the space exploration company founded by entrepreneur Samuel Reid, that will send a small satellite to the moon in 2023. The mission is being paid for entirely with the cryptocurrency Dogecoin, which is known for its popular "Doge" meme. Doge-1 is being developed by Geometric Energy Corporation, which announced the project in May 2021. The satellite will be launched aboard a SpaceX Falcon 9 rocket and will be used to collect "lunar-spatial intelligence" using onboard sensors and a camera. Mission to launch a small (40 kg) satellite into lunar orbit to explore the moon and display images and digital art on a small screen on lunar orbite that will be broadcast back to earth. According to Samuel Reid, a miniature screen on the Doge-1 satellite will display advertisements, images and logos, which will subsequently be broadcast to the Earth.

Doge-1 CubeSat is a small satellite, which, according to the latest data, will be launched in 2023. The CubeSat is being developed by Geometric Energy Corporation, a Canadian space exploration technology firm, in collaboration with SpaceX. The Doge-1 CubeSat is designed as a small, lightweight spacecraft that will be sent to the Moon to collect data and conduct scientific research. It will be equipped with sensors and cameras to capture images and data of the lunar surface in order to improve our understanding of the lunar geology, environment and potential resources. The mission is important not only because it will be the first time a spacecraft has been funded entirely with cryptocurrency, but also because it could pave the way for future missions to the moon and beyond using this funding model.

SpaceX vice president of commercial sales Tom Ochinero said in a statement that DOGE-1 “will demonstrate the application of cryptocurrency beyond Earth orbit and set the foundation for interplanetary commerce.”

Launch date 
The launch of Doge-1 was announced by Elon Musk on Twitter in May 2021

The Doge-1 launch will be combined with the Nova-C IM-1 missions, a joint mission between Intuitive Machines and NASA.

The Nova-C mission has been repeatedly postponed, which is why the Doge-1 launch announced for 2022 was also postponed.

The launch of the Nova-C IM-1 mission and joint equipment, which, among other things, includes Doge-1, will not be until mid-2023, according to NASA site.

On the website of Geometric Space, a subsidiary of Geometric Energy, the launch date of Doge-1 is not currently indicated and is subject to change.

References 

CubeSats
Missions to the Moon
Private spaceflight